Grand Prairie Township may refer to one of the following places in the United States:

 Grand Prairie Township, Jefferson County, Illinois
 Grand Prairie Township, Nobles County, Minnesota
 Grand Prairie Township, Platte County, Nebraska
 Grand Prairie Township, Barnes County, North Dakota
 Grand Prairie Township, Marion County, Ohio

Township name disambiguation pages